KKNE (940 AM) is a radio station licensed to Waipahu, Hawaii and located in the Honolulu, Hawaii radio market, broadcasting with a power of 10,000 watts. The station's format was last a hybrid of traditional Hawaiian music and talk/information geared toward adults of Native Hawaiian descent. The station is owned by SummitMedia. The station's studios are located in Downtown Honolulu and its transmitter was located near Kunia Camp. It was also featured on Oceanic Spectrum digital channel 856 for the entire state of Hawaii. It was originally on 920 kHz and moved to 940 kHz in 1962.

A unique feature of KKNE was a greeting and current time given in Hawaiian and English along with the station identification at the top and bottom of each hour (at :00 and :30 past the hour), with a steel guitar playing as background music.

History
Prior to its flip to Traditional Hawaiian, KKNE was home to longtime country music outlet KDEO and later Japanese music-formatted KJPN.

The license was surrendered to the Federal Communications Commission on December 5, 2022, who cancelled it the same day. It was reinstated on December 8, 2022 but remains silent.

References

External links
FCC History Cards for KKNE

1950 establishments in Hawaii
Radio stations established in 1950
KNE